Micklefield railway station serves the village of Micklefield, near Garforth in West Yorkshire, England.

Just east of the station, the York and Selby Lines split in their respective directions.

History

The station was originally opened by the Leeds and Selby Railway in 1834, though buildings were not erected (on the north side) until the following year. The line towards Church Fenton was added by the North Eastern Railway in 1869 and four years later the first of two rounds of improvements to the station were initiated, with the rebuilding of the 1835 station house.  Even after this was completed, there were complaints leveled at the NER by local travellers over the facilities on offer and so in 1879, the contract for a completely new station was placed.  This included new platforms, footbridge and a booking office on the westbound platform, along with access from the original A1 Great North Road (since bypassed - the present A1 crosses the railway to the east, near the junction of the two lines).   The buildings and bridge were demolished in the 1970s (though the older station house still stands) and there are now only basic waiting shelters on each (staggered) platform.

Facilities

The station is unstaffed  but now has a pair of ticket vending machines available to allow passengers to buy tickets prior to travel or collect advance purchase ones.  Train running information is provided via CIS displays, automated announcements and timetable poster boards.  Step-free access is available to both platforms.

Services

Monday to Saturday there is a half-hourly service calling at all stations to Leeds westbound and alternately to York (express) and  via  eastbound.  Alternate Leeds-bound trains run through to  via Bradford Interchange - this service commenced at the winter 2019 timetable change and serves South Milford and Selby, then runs express to Brough and Hull.

On Sundays, there are two trains per hour to Leeds and one each to York and Selby.  The through trains to  via Preston that formerly called here on Sundays no longer do so and passengers wishing to travel there must change at Leeds.

Notes

External links

Railway stations in Leeds
DfT Category F1 stations
Railway stations in Great Britain opened in 1834
Railway stations in Great Britain closed in 1840
Railway stations in Great Britain opened in 1850
Northern franchise railway stations
Former Leeds and Selby Railway stations